Little Wars is an album by Unwed Sailor. It was recorded between December 27, 2002 and November 7, 2007. The album was released on April 1, 2008, by Burnt Toast Vinyl.

Critical reception
PopMatters called the album "geometrically precise yet warmly organic, serenely unperturbed but with a bubbling undercurrent of mirth," writing that "this is what might happen to post-rock if you put it in a warm corner of the garden and allowed it to grow." Exclaim! called it "instrumental post-rock covered in molasses ... the pace is lethargic, barely creeping beyond a plod."

Track listing
"Copper Islands"
"Little Wars"
"The Garden" 
"Aurora"
"Campanile"
"Echo Roads"
"Nauvoo"
"Lonely Bulls"
"Numeral"

Personnel
Stalactite Oracle Studio Session (December 27–28, 2002)
 Jonathan Ford
 Matthew Putman
 Matthew Depper
 Brooks Tipton
 Nic Tse
 Jeff Shoop
 James McAllister
Ester Drang Studio Session (mid-2004)
 Jonathan Ford
 Aaron Ford
 Brooks Tipton
 Stephen Tucker
 Bryce Chambers
 James McAllister
 Matthew Magee
Little Wars Blackwatch Studio Sessions 1 and 2 (October 12–19, 2007 and November 5–7, 2007)
 Jonathan Ford
 Nic Tse
 Matthew Putman
 Brooks Tipton
 Matthew Depper
 Patrick Ryan
 Andrew Haldeman
 Ryan Lindsey
 Chad Copelin

References

2008 albums
Unwed Sailor albums